Cigarettes After Sex is an American dream pop band formed in El Paso, Texas, in 2008 by Greg Gonzalez. The band is known for their ethereal, limerent and often dream-like musical style, lyrics often based on the themes of romance and love, as well as Gonzalez's voice, which has been described as "androgynous". While marketed as an ambient pop band, Cigarettes After Sex are also considered to be shoegaze, slowcore and indie rock.

The band's debut extended play (EP), I., was released in 2012, with the song "Nothing's Gonna Hurt You Baby" eventually becoming a sleeper hit through commercial licensing. After the release of the standalone single "Affection" in 2015, the band released their self-titled debut studio album in June 2017 to positive reviews. The band's second studio album, Cry, was released on October 25, 2019.

History
Cigarettes After Sex was formed in El Paso, Texas, in 2008. Gonzalez recorded the first EP, I., in a four-story stairway at his alma mater, University of Texas at El Paso, calling the experience "basically an accident; kind of an experiment".

Gonzalez relocated to Brooklyn, New York, where the band's single "Affection" was recorded and released in 2015 along with a cover of REO Speedwagon's "Keep On Loving You".

Through music recommendations, Cigarettes After Sex became popular on YouTube, leading to live performances across Europe, Asia, and the United States. The band then released their self-titled debut studio album on June 9, 2017.

In August 2019 the band announced their second studio album, titled Cry, along with the single "Heavenly". The album was released on October 25, 2019.

A new song, titled "Pistol", was released in November 2022.

Musical style and influences
In a feature for Noisey by Vice, Christina Cacouris describes Cigarettes After Sex as "elemental, hazy and romantic, but with a noir edge underneath Gonzalez's androgynous voice" as well as "sweet and sentimental". "As the band’s name suggests, it’s reminiscent of lying in bed, but its ambient qualities don’t prevent it from being music you can dance to." Gonzalez cites Françoise Hardy as his favorite singer and Miles Davis as having great impact. In an interview with Sound of Boston, he also noted films such as L'Avventura and The Double Life of Veronique were influential to the feel and sound of the music in "Affection" and their LP. The band also includes the Cowboy Junkies' album The Trinity Session, Julee Cruise, and Cocteau Twins as influences. The music blog Eardrums Music describes the band as "slow, dreamy and beautiful with gorgeous, tender vocals and very good lyrics" and compares it to Mazzy Star. Music bloggers behind Swell Tone describe Cigarettes After Sex as a band producing "melancholy, slow pop that will sweetly rock any listener into a listless stupor."

Reviewing "Affection" for Independentmusicnews.com, Jae Pyl concludes that "there's just such an intimacy to Cigarettes After Sex's sound that it's impossible to not let it into the pit of your belly."

Members
Since inception in 2008, the group has included a number of different members and collaborators led by Greg Gonzalez:

Current members
 Greg Gonzalez – founder, lead vocals, electric guitar, acoustic guitar 
 Randall Miller – bass
 Jacob Tomsky – drums

Former members

 Phillip Tubbs - keyboards, electric guitar
 Greg Leah – drums
 Steve Herrada – keyboards
 Emily Davis – acoustic guitar
 Josh Marcus - keyboards

Discography

Studio albums

Extended plays

Singles

Demos
 Cigarettes After Sex (Romans 13:9) (2011)

Notes

References

External links
 

2008 establishments in Texas
Dream pop musical groups
Musical groups established in 2008
Musical groups from Brooklyn
Musical groups from El Paso, Texas
Musical quartets
Partisan Records artists
Sadcore and slowcore groups
American shoegaze musical groups